Fausto Antonio Tienza Núñez (born 8 January 1990) is a Spanish professional footballer who plays for Spanish side Racing de Santander. Mainly a central midfielder, he can also play as a central defender.

Club career
Born in Talavera la Real, Province of Badajoz, Fausto joined Valencia CF's youth system in 2004, aged 14. In 2006–07, while still a junior, he made his senior debut, playing one match for the reserves in the Segunda División B. In January 2009 he was loaned to neighbouring CF La Nucía and, six months later, moved to another Segunda B club Caravaca CF, also on loan.

In the 2010 summer, still owned by the Che, Fausto joined CD La Muela also in the third level, starting in all of his league appearances but suffering team relegation. On 27 August 2011, he rescinded with Valencia and signed with UD Melilla in the same category; he scored his first goal as a senior on 6 May 2012, against AD Ceuta.

On 12 January 2013, Fausto signed a contract with Real Betis, being assigned to the reserves. On 8 March he made his official debut with the Andalusians' first team, replacing Dorlan Pabón in the dying minutes of a 2–1 La Liga home win against CA Osasuna.

On 15 August 2014, Fausto signed a one-year deal with Segunda División club AD Alcorcón. He scored his first professional goal on 26 October, but in a 1–3 home loss against Real Zaragoza.

On 1 July 2016, Fausto signed a two-year deal with CA Osasuna, newly promoted to the main category. On 24 January 2018, he signed an 18-month contract with Cádiz CF in the second division, after cutting ties with his previous club.

On 9 July 2018, Fausto terminated his contract with Cádiz, and signed for fellow league team Extremadura UD eight days later.

On 12 September 2019, Fausto signed a two-year contract with Greek club Panathinaikos for an undisclosed fee. On the January transfer window, Fausto Tienza has officially returned to his native country. The 30-year-old has been heavily out of favour ever since joining the club only a few months ago. He only featured a mere 52 minutes for the club and has joined Gimnàstic de Tarragona in the Spanish third tier in a loan move until the end of this season.

On 27 May 2021, Fausto joined Racing de Santander in the third division.

References

External links

1990 births
Living people
Spanish footballers
Footballers from Extremadura
Association football midfielders
La Liga players
Segunda División players
Primera Federación players
Segunda División B players
Tercera División players
Valencia CF Mestalla footballers
CF La Nucía players
Caravaca CF players
CD La Muela players
UD Melilla footballers
Betis Deportivo Balompié footballers
Real Betis players
AD Alcorcón footballers
CA Osasuna players
Cádiz CF players
Extremadura UD footballers
Gimnàstic de Tarragona footballers
Racing de Santander players
Panathinaikos F.C. players
Spanish expatriate footballers
Spanish expatriate sportspeople in Greece
Expatriate footballers in Greece